The 1984 Indiana gubernatorial election was held on November 6, 1984, in all 92 counties of Indiana. Robert D. Orr, the state's incumbent Republican governor, who defeated former State Treasurer John Snyder for the nomination, was comfortably reelected to a second term, defeating State Senator Wayne Townsend and two minor party challengers in the general election. His victory marked the fifth consecutive victory for the Republican Party in Indiana gubernatorial elections, and the last time Republicans would win the governorship in the 20th century.

Despite losing the election, Townsend, who defeated former United States Attorney Virginia Dill McCarty for the nomination, received 195,351 more votes than the Democratic nominee for president, Walter Mondale, who won less than 38% of the vote in Indiana and was handily defeated by Ronald Reagan in the presidential election of 1984. Townsend's running mate, former Marion County Deputy Prosecutor Ann DeLaney, was the first woman ever to run for Lieutenant Governor of Indiana in the history of the state.

, this was the most recent Indiana gubernatorial election in which both major party candidates are now deceased.

General election

References

1984 Indiana elections
1984
Indiana